The rivière du Chêne (in English: Oak River) is a tributary of the south shore of the St. Lawrence River. This river flows in the municipalities of Sainte-Agathe-de-Lotbinière, Saint-Gilles, Dosquet, Lyster (MRC de L'Érable Regional County Municipality), Saint-Janvier-de-Joly, Val-Alain, Saint-Édouard-de-Lotbinière, Lotbinière and Leclercville, in the Lotbinière Regional County Municipality, in the administrative region of Chaudière-Appalaches, in Quebec, in Canada.

Geography 

The main neighboring watersheds of the Chêne River are:
 North side: St. Lawrence River;
 East side: rivière du Bois Clair, rivière aux Ormes, bas des Boucher, rivière du Petit Sault, Henri River, Noire River, Beaurivage River, Rouge River, Filkars River;
 South side: Bécancour River, Armagh River;
 West side: Petite rivière du Chêne, St. Lawrence River.

The Chêne River has its source in an agricultural area west of the village of Sainte-Agathe-de-Lotbinière, northeast of route 271 and south from route 218.
Near its mouth on the Saint Lawrence it flows past the Moulin du Portage, a historical water-powered flour mill.

Upper course of the river (segment of )

From its head area, the Chêne River flows over:
  east, to a country road;
  north-west, up to route 218;
  towards the west, cutting the southern part of the territory of Saint-Gilles for about 100 meters, up to route 271;
  westward, to the municipal limit of Sainte-Agathe-de-Lotbinière and Lyster;
  to the northwest, crossing the northern part of Lyster;
  heading west, to route 116, in the municipality of Dosquet.

Intermediate course of the river (segment of )

From Route 116, the Chêne River flows over:
  northwesterly, curving northeasterly, in Dosquet, to the municipal limit of Lyster;
  west into Lyster, to a road;
  westward, to the limit of Lyster and Saint-Janvier-de-Joly;
  westward, in the municipality of Saint-Janvier-de-Joly;
  west, in the municipality of Lyster, to the confluence of the rivière aux Chevreuils;
  west, to a road;
  west, to the road bridge in the village of Val-Alain;

Lower course of the river (segment of )

From the confluence with the Henri River located in Leclercville, the Chêne River flows over:
  northwesterly, zigzagging through Leclercville to route 132;
  north-west, up to its confluence.

The Chêne River flows over the Chêne Flats, on the south shore of the estuary of Saint Lawrence, in the village of Leclercville. Its confluence is located at the tip of Leclercville, west of the center of the village of Lotbinière, east of the center of the village of Deschaillons-sur-Saint-Laurent and west of the village of Saint-Édouard.

Toponymy 
The toponym Rivière du Chêne was formalized on December 5, 1968, at the Commission de toponymie du Québec.

See also 

 List of rivers of Quebec

References 

Rivers of Chaudière-Appalaches
Lotbinière Regional County Municipality
Rivers of Centre-du-Québec